Swadesh Chakraborty (born 22 December 1943) was a member of the 14th Lok Sabha of India. He represented the Howrah constituency of West Bengal and is a member of the Communist Party of India (Marxist) (CPI(M)) political party. He was the Mayor of Howrah Municipal Corporation.

External links
 Official biographical sketch in Parliament of India website

Living people
1943 births
Communist Party of India (Marxist) politicians from West Bengal
People from Howrah
India MPs 2004–2009
Lok Sabha members from West Bengal
West Bengal municipal councillors
India MPs 1999–2004